Frankau is an English surname of German-Jewish origin.

List of people with the surname 
(Most (all?) are related).

 Arthur Frankau (1849-1904), London merchant  
 Claude Frankau (1883-1967), British surgeon
 Gilbert Frankau (1884-1952), British novelist and poet
 Isabella Frankau (died 1967), British psychiatrist (Lady Frankau) 
 Joan Bennett (literary scholar) (1896-1986), British literary scholar (née Frankau)  
 Julia Frankau (1859-1916), British novelist
 Nicholas Frankau (born 1954), English actor
 Pamela Frankau (1908-1967), English novelist
 Ronald Frankau (1894-1951), English comedian
 Rosemary Frankau (1933-2017), British actress

See also 

 Frank (surname)

Surnames of British Isles origin
Surnames of English origin
Surnames of German origin